Maple Grove is a historic estate located at Poughkeepsie, Dutchess County, New York.  The estate consists of eight contributing buildings: the main house, farmer's cottage (c. 1850), barn (c. 1850), carriage barn (c. 1850), garage (c. 1850), shed, and two cottages (c. 1830). Also on the property is a pair of contributing sandstone gateposts (c. 1850). The main house was built in 1850 in the Italianate style and remodeled in 1891.  It is constructed of painted red brick and has a -story, three-bay, main block flanked by 2-story, three-bay-wide wings.  It has a large, 2-story rear kitchen wing.  It features a prominent 1-story open wood porch.

It was added to the National Register of Historic Places in 2001.

References

Houses on the National Register of Historic Places in New York (state)
Italianate architecture in New York (state)
Houses completed in 1850
Houses in Poughkeepsie, New York
Museums in Dutchess County, New York
Historic house museums in New York (state)
Tourist attractions in Poughkeepsie, New York
National Register of Historic Places in Poughkeepsie, New York